Petatán is a municipality in the Guatemalan department of Huehuetenango.

References

Municipalities of the Huehuetenango Department